Tudur, from old Welsh ,  is the Welsh form of the given name Theodoric and may refer to:

  (Theodoric the Old), eponymous founder of the Tudor dynasty
  (died 1367), Welsh landowner, soldier and administrator of the Tudors of Penmynydd family
  (c. 1357 – 1405), participated in the rebellion of his brother, 
  (fl. second half of the 14th century), a Welsh language poet
  (1420–1490), Welsh-language poet
  (1457–1509), the Welsh-language name for Henry VII of England (r. from 1485)
  (1522–1602), Welsh-language poet
 R. Tudur Jones (1921–1998), Welsh nationalist and Calvinist theologian
 Owain Tudur Jones (born 1984), Welsh international footballer

See also
Tudor (disambiguation)
Pandy Tudur, village in the county borough of Conwy, north Wales

Welsh masculine given names